Hanteng Autos (officially Jiangxi Hanteng Automobile Co., Ltd.) is a privately owned Chinese automobile manufacturer headquartered in Shangrao, Jiangxi, China. It is a private automobile manufacturing company that mainly focuses on the research and development, manufacture and marketing of traditional fuel-powered vehicles, new energy vehicles, and automotive parts.

History
Established in November 2013 and headquartered in the Shangrao Economic and Technological Development Zone in Shangrao, Jiangxi.
 November, 2013- parent company established.
 December, 2013- Construction of the Hanteng Autos factory started.
 June, 2014- New Energy development started with the launch of the Hanteng BMS project with investments up to 37 hundred million rmb.
 December, 2015- Production of the first product, Hanteng X7 has begun.
 November, 2016- Hanteng X5 introduced to the Chinese market.
 September, 2017- Contract signed with Derways, a Russian auto manufacturer, making Russia the first export market for Hanteng Autos.
 November, 2017- Hanteng X7S and Hanteng X7 PHEV launched at the Guangzhou Auto Show.
 April, 2022- Hanteng declared bankruptcy.

Subsidiary
 Hanteng New Energy Automobile Technology Co., Ltd.
 Jiangxi Hanteng New Energy Automobile Co., Ltd.
 Jiangxi Hanteng Automobile Sales Co., Ltd.

Current models
 Hanteng X5
 Hanteng X5 EV
 Hanteng X7
 Hanteng X7S
 Hanteng X7 PHEV
 Hanteng X8
 Hanteng V7

Product Gallery

References

External links 

Hanteng Autos International

Companies based in Jiangxi
Vehicle manufacturing companies established in 2013
Car manufacturers of China
Chinese brands
Chinese companies established in 2013
2013 establishments in China
Privately held companies of China
Manufacturing companies of China
Manufacturing companies established in 2013